San Javier, Río Negro may reference

 San Javier, Río Negro Province, in Argentina
 San Javier, Uruguay, in the Uruguayan Río Negro department